Dierogekko validiclavis, also known as the bold-striped gecko, is a gecko endemic to Grande Terre in New Caledonia.

References

Dierogekko
Reptiles described in 1988
Taxa named by Ross Allen Sadlier
Geckos of New Caledonia